Strictly Platinum is the debut studio album by American rapper Princess Superstar. It was released in 1996 via 5th Beetle and produced by Greg Talenfeld, Godfrey Diamond, J.Z. Barrell, Wm. Berger and Greg Griffith.

Track listing

Sample credits
Track 6 contains elements from "Stay" by David Bowie (1976), "Hot Stuff" by The Rolling Stones (1976), "I Want You (She's So Heavy)" and "Get Back" by The Beatles (1969)

Personnel
 Concetta Kirschner – main artist, lead vocals, guitar
 Aaron 'Roboto' Cantor – featured artist (track 12)
 Marvin Rucker – featured artist (track 12)
 Art Lavis – additional vocals, guitar
 Doug Pressman – additional vocals, bass
 Dupert Niles – backing vocals
 Jeffrey Jensen – backing vocals
 Linda Hagood – backing vocals
 Patrick Dougherty – keyboards
 Kirsten Pro Jansen – drums
 Al Martin – congas
 Catarina Nygren – saxophone
 E.R. Huckleberry – trumpet
 William M. Berger – guitar (tracks: 4, 10), producer (track 12)
 Godfrey Diamond – producer (tracks: 1, 5, 8, 9)
 Greg Talenfeld – producer (tracks: 2-3, 6, 11), co-producer (tracks: 1, 5, 8-9), engineering (tracks: 1-3, 5-6, 8-9, 11-12)
 J.Z. Barrell – producer & engineering (tracks: 4, 7, 10)
 Greg Griffith – co-producer (tracks: 2-3, 6, 11)

References

1996 debut albums
Princess Superstar albums